This is a list of electoral results for the Electoral district of Leederville in Western Australian state elections.

Members for Leederville

Election results

Elections in the 1950s

Elections in the 1940s

Elections in the 1930s

 Preferences were not distributed.

|- style="background-color:#E9E9E9"
! colspan="6" style="text-align:left;" |After distribution of preferences

Elections in the 1920s

 Preferences were not distributed.

Elections in the 1910s

 Veryard's designation at the 1914 election was simply "Liberal", rather than "National Liberal".

 Preferences were not distributed.

References

Western Australian state electoral results by district